Gilbert M. "Mig" Billings (March 22, 1890 – January 24, 1970) was an American football and baseball player and coach and otolaryngologist. He served as the head football coach at Wake Forest University in 1916, compiling a record of 3–3. Billings was also the head baseball coach at Wake Forest from 1916 to 1917, tallying a mark of 18–17–1.

Head coaching record

Football

References

External links
 

1890 births
1969 deaths
Wake Forest Demon Deacons baseball coaches
Wake Forest Demon Deacons baseball players
Wake Forest Demon Deacons football coaches
Wake Forest Demon Deacons football players
Players of American football from Raleigh, North Carolina
Baseball players from Raleigh, North Carolina